Virgule ('twig') may refer to:
 A "/ " used to mark line breaks
 Secondary chord, in music
 A "|" marking poetic meter

See also
Virgile